Lafayette Municipal Airport  is a city-owned, public-use airport located two nautical miles (3 km) west of the central business district of Lafayette, in Macon County, Tennessee, United States.

Facilities
It has one runway designated 01/19 with an asphalt surface measuring 5,200 by 75 feet (1,585 x 23 m).

References

External links 
 Lafayette, TN city website

Airports in Tennessee
Transportation in Macon County, Tennessee
Buildings and structures in Macon County, Tennessee